Osvaldoginella gomezi is a species of minute sea snail, a marine gastropod mollusk or micromollusk in the family Cystiscidae.

Description
The shell of this species grows to a length of 3 mm.

Distribution
This species occurs in the Caribbean Sea at Cuba, and in the Gulf of Mexico.

References
Citations

Sources
 Cossignani T. (2006). Marginellidae & Cystiscidae of the World. L'Informatore Piceno. 408pp
 McCleery T. & Wakefield A. (2007). A review of the enigmatic genus Canalispira Jousseaume, 1875 (Gastropoda: Cystiscidae) with the description of three new species from the western Atlantic. Novapex 8(1): 1–10-page(s): 2
 Rosenberg, G., F. Moretzsohn, and E. F. García. 2009. Gastropoda (Mollusca) of the Gulf of Mexico, pp. 579–699 in Felder, D.L. and D.K. Camp (eds.), Gulf of Mexico–Origins, Waters, and Biota. Biodiversity. Texas A&M Press, College Station, Texas

gomezi
Gastropods described in 1997